Lezo may refer to:

Blas de Lezo (1689-1741), Spanish admiral 
Lezo, Aklan, municipality in the province of Aklan, Philippines
Lezo, Spain, town and municipality in the province of Gipuzkoa, Basque Country, Spain